Zwitter is the German word for "hybrid" or "hermaphrodite". It may refer to:
 A zwitterion, in chemistry
 An intersex person, in Karl Heinrich Ulrichs' Uranian typology 
 A song on the Rammstein album Mutter